Katharina Ribbeck is a German-American biologist. She is the Andrew (1956) and Erna Viterbi Professor of Biological Engineering at the Masschusetts Institute of Technology. She is known as one of the first researchers to study how mucus impacts microbial behavior.  Ribbeck investigates both the function of mucus as a barrier to pathogens such as fungi, bacteria, and viruses  and how mucus can be leveraged for therapeutic purposes. She has also studied changes that cervical mucus undergoes before birth, which may lead to a novel diagnostic for the risk of preterm birth.

Education 
Ribbeck received her B.S. in Biology from the University of Heidelberg in 1998. During her senior year, she attended the University of California, San Diego, to study neurobiology for her diploma thesis. She earned her Ph.D. in Biology, also from the University of Heidelberg, in 2001.

Career 
Upon completing her Ph.D., Ribbeck continued her research as a postdoctoral scientist at the European Molecular Biology Laboratory in Heidelberg, Germany, and then Harvard Medical School. After her postdoctoral research, she moved to Harvard University as an independent Bauer Fellow in 2007, where she began to investigate how particles and bacteria move through mucus barriers. 

In 2010, Ribbeck moved to the Department of Biological Engineering at the Massachusetts Institute of Technology as an assistant professor. She attained tenure as a full professor in 2017.

Research on nuclear pore complexes 
During her Ph.D. work, Ribbeck investigated the selective transport of molecules through the nuclear pore complex, which is partly mediated by a hydrogel barrier. With her Ph.D. advisor, Dirk Görlich, Ribbeck developed a selective phase model for molecular transport through the nuclear pore barrier. Görlich and Ribbeck also showed that molecular transport through nuclear pore complexes may be facilitated by hydrophobic interactions.

Research on mitotic spindles 
As a postdoctoral researcher at the European Molecular Biology Laboratory, Ribbeck studied proteins involved in the organization of the mitotic spindle, a dynamic bundle consisting of proteins and molecules that aids in chromosome segregation during cell division. Her research contributed to the discovery of a novel protein (NuSAP) that plays a crucial role in mitotic spindle organization.

Research on mucus 
In 2007, Ribbeck's research returned to hydrogels, with a specific focus on mucus, i.e., a large natural hydrogel that is closely related to the polymer network she and Görlich had proposed to exist within nuclear pore complexes. Her work has elucidated the role of mucins, a primary component of mucus, in human health. Ribbeck is known for her pioneering work in this field, which has shown that mucus plays an active role in protecting against harmful pathogens, including fungi, bacteria, and viruses. Specifically, her research has shown that mucins and their associated sugar chains (glycans) can "tame" pathogens by inhibiting virulence traits such as biofilm formation, cell adhesion, and toxin secretion.

She has shown that mucins prevent bacteria such as Pseudomonas aeruginosa and Streptococcus mutans, the bacteria that cause tooth decay, from forming biofilms, which make them hard to eradicate. Ribbeck demonstrated that mucin glycans can reduce the virulence of pathogens such as Pseudomonas aeruginosa, a bacterium that can cause illness in individuals with cystic fibrosis or compromised immune systems, by inhibiting the cell-cell communication, toxin secretion, and biofilm formation ability of these bacteria.

Ribbeck's work has also demonstrated the role of mucus in protecting against fungal infections. Her studies have shown that mucins and specific mucin glycans induce a morphological change, accompanied by a reduction in biofilm formation and cell adhesion, in Candida albicans, a fungal pathogen that causes a variety of diseases in humans. Her work has also shown that mucins found in multiple types of mucus, including human spit, can prevent fungal pathogens from causing disease in healthy humans. 

Ribbeck identified a correlation between the properties of mucus in the cervix in pregnant women and the likelihood of preterm birth and has developed probes to test mucus permeability as a step towards diagnosing the risk for premature birth. 

Ribbeck has extensively investigated the biophysical properties of mucus and other hydrogels and the mechanisms by which some particles and molecules, including viruses such as SARS-CoV-2, selectively pass through the barrier. Ribbeck has also studied hydrogels produced by pathogens and has found that the extracellular matrix formed by the pathogenic bacterium Pseudomonas aeruginosa protects the bacterium against antibiotics.

Ribbeck has investigated approaches for engineering mucus, with the aim of potentially influencing the population of bacteria in the human body. In collaboration with others, Ribbeck demonstrated that synthetic mucins can block toxins produced by Vibrio cholerae, the bacteria that causes cholera. She has also shown that purified foreign mucins can prevent viruses from infecting cells and suggested that they could be used to supplement the anti-viral activity of native mucins.

Awards and Achievements 
Ribbeck is passionate about educating others on the importance of mucus in human health. Together with her lab, she gives presentation about her work on mucus at the MIT Museum and the Boston Museum of Science."The intention here is to really introduce a field to the generations to come, so they grow up understanding that mucus is not a waste product. It's an integral part of our physiology and a really important piece of our health. If we understand it, it can really give us a lot of information that will help us stay healthy and possibly treat diseases." (Ribbeck, 2018)In 2015, Ribbeck and her team produced a TED-Ed lesson to provide basic education about mucus and its role in human health. Ribbeck has been interviewed on NPR and STAT news and has been featured in articles in WIRED and MIT News.
 2003: Ruprecht-Karls Prize Heidelberg University
2007: Award for Genome-Related Research (Merck)
2013: John Kendrew Award (EMBL).
 2014: Popular Science, "Brilliant 10"
2015: NSF CAREER award
 2015:  Junior Bose Award for Excellence in Teaching (MIT) 
 2016: Harold E. Edgerton Faculty Achievement Award (MIT)
 2018: Professor Amar G. Bose Research Grant (MIT), given for "work that is unorthodox, and potentially world-changing".

References

External links 

 The Ribbeck lab
 How mucus keeps you healthy (YouTube)
 Science Friday: It's snot what you think
 STAT News: Why mucus is the ‘unsung hero’ of the human body
 WIRED: How the Sugars in Spit Tame the Body's Unruly Fungi
 MIT Technology Review: The science of slime

Living people
American biophysicists
MIT School of Engineering faculty
Women biochemists
21st-century American women scientists
21st-century American chemists
Heidelberg University alumni
21st-century American physicists
Scientists from Darmstadt
Year of birth missing (living people)
American women academics
German emigrants to the United States